Historical coats of arms of the U.S. states date back to the admission of the first states to the Union. Despite the widely accepted practice of determining early statehood from the date of ratification of the United States Constitution, many of the original colonies referred to themselves as states shortly after the Declaration of Independence was signed on 4 July 1776. Committees of political leaders and intellectuals were established by state legislatures to research and propose a seal and coat of arms. Many of these members were signers of the Articles of Confederation, Declaration of Independence, and United States Constitution. Several of the earliest adopted state coats of arms and seals were similar or identical to their colonial counterparts.

State Arms of the Union, illustrated by Henry Mitchell and published by Louis Prang (known as the father of the lithographic industry), offers historically accurate renderings of the state's coats of arms as they existed in 1876. An accomplished engraver with the Bureau of Engraving and Printing for 40 years, Mitchell was responsible for engraving several coats of arms for official state use as well as arms for well-known educational and philanthropic organizations. The illustrations are presented alongside proof impressions from the engraved dies used to print the state arms on the first issue of United States National Bank Notes.

Coat of arms

Heraldic arms were worn (embroidered) on a coat which knights wore over their armor, hence coat of arms, a term which dates back roughly 1,000 years to jousting tournaments.

Arms versus seal
A state coat of arms may exist independently of the seal, but the reverse is not generally the case. A seal contains a coat of arms or other devices whereas a state coat of arms constitutes the bulk of a seal, except for the wording identifying it as the "Great Seal of the State of..." A "seal" has been described as the design impressed on public or legislative official documents, whereas a coat of arms generally appears for illustrative purposes. Examples include flags and banners, and state militia uniform caps and buttons, as well as specifically-designed regimental coats of arms for U.S. Infantry Regiments, and National Guard  units.

Design
The design of a state coat of arms or seal has generally been authorized by a provision in the state constitution or a legislative act. In most instances a committee (more often than not consisting of three members) was appointed to study the issue, seek advice from qualified artists, historians, legal scholars, etc., and report back to the authorizing legislative body with a design for their approval. Historically, this committee has consisted of notable members of society and elected officials.

The first committee to design the Great Seal of the United States was appointed on 4 July 1776 by the Second Continental Congress and consisted of Benjamin Franklin, John Adams, Thomas Jefferson. Their design was rejected on 20 August 1776. The second committee (James Lovell, John Morin Scott, and William Churchill Houston) design met with the same fate. It was the third committee (Arthur Middleton, Elias Boudinot, John Rutledge, who consulted with William Barton) that submitted a design which was approved on 20 July 1782.

Individual states approached their coats of arms and seals in a similar manner (i.e., seeking direction from the statesmen and scholars of their community). A few of those involved in the design of state arms and seals include (but is not limited to): John Jay and Gouverneur Morris (New York); Francis Hopkinson (New Jersey); David Rittenhouse and George Clymer (Pennsylvania); and George Mason, Benjamin Franklin, Benjamin West, and Thomas Jefferson (Virginia).

Authority
An impression of the Great Seal of a state (or its coat of arms) has long been required on official documents ranging from deeds to legislative acts. It was the emblem that certified the authenticity of a given document or that the authority of the state was invested in said document. Judicial decisions upheld the need for a valid seal and/or coat of arms on notarized documents.

One of the more compelling legislative actions recognizing the legal importance/authority of the state seal and arms occurred in February 1873 when a joint session of the United States Congress refused to recognize Arkansas's electoral votes in the November 1872 presidential election. The official tally of the state's electoral votes was submitted with an invalid seal (bearing the coat of arms of the office of the Secretary of the State of Arkansas versus the seal of the state of Arkansas bearing the state arms).

Regulation
Courts and state legislatures also opined on the inappropriate uses of state seals and arms. Most states barred their use for any kind of advertising. Reproduction for corporate use was similarly prohibited and such infractions were classified as offenses against public property. The 2003 Code of Federal Regulations pertaining to the Bureau of Alcohol, Tobacco, Firearms and Explosives prohibits the use of state seals or coats of arms in product branding so as not to mislead the public into thinking that a commercial product has been endorsed by a government organization.

Instances of design inaccuracies

A state coat of arms provided an opportunity to convey the natural and industrial resources available to its residents. Common themes depicted in state arms include farming, industry, transportation (e.g., boats, trains, and wagons), and nature (e.g., sunsets and mountains). The Ohio and Indiana state arms depict fairly substantial mountains in the distance. In reality, the highest points in Ohio and Indiana are Campbell Hill and Hoosier Hill respectively.

The Florida state arms also depicts mountains in the distance but the highest point in the state is  feet high. In addition to the distortion of local geography, the image also contains historically inaccurate information. The period depicted in the state arms (c. 1830) was a time when the local Seminole Native Americans were hostile toward white settlers; the warm greeting (e.g., flower petals strewn on the ground) offered by the Seminole to the arriving steam ship would have been highly improbable. Furthermore, the Seminole woman depicted would not have worn any headdress, particularly one of northern and western Seminole tribes.

State Arms of the Union
Published in 1876 by Louis Prang and illustrated by Henry Mitchell, State Arms of the Union contains a chromolithographed title page depicting the Great Seal of the United States and seven color plates with 45 state and territorial coats of arms. The book was likely published for the Philadelphia Centennial Exposition.

Louis Prang
Louis Prang was born 12 March 1824 in Breslau. At the age of 13 he began apprenticing for his father and learned to dye and print calico, as well as wood and metal engraving. Prang emigrated to Boston in 1850 and became an illustrator for a number of local publications. Starting a business partnership in 1856 to manufacture copper and lithographic plates, Prang became sole proprietor in 1860 and named the company L. Prang & Co. He specialized in color printing, more specifically "chromolithography" Prang spent over four decades studying and creating a standard of colors and engraved and printed maps, prints of contemporary celebrities, and color reproductions of famous works of art.

In 1875 Prang was responsible for introducing the Christmas card to America. He created an annual design competition for his Christmas cards (run between 1880 and 1884), and judges included John La Farge, Samuel Colman, Stanford White, and Louis Comfort Tiffany. Some of the notable winners included Elihu Vedder, Rosina Emmet Sherwood, Edwin Blashfield, Thomas Moran, and Will Hicok Low. Prang has become known as the "father of the American Christmas card", as well as the "father of the lithographic industry".

Henry Mitchell
Henry Mitchell was born in New York in 1835 and went to school in Philadelphia. At the age of 10 he began working with his uncle to learn the trade of gem and steel engraving. By the age of 20 (1855), Mitchell had engraved the official seals for the Kingdom of Hawaii.

In 1868 Mitchell joined the Bureau of Engraving and Printing and for 40 years engraved stamped envelopes. Through his BEP work, Mitchell was also responsible for engraving the seal of the Secretary of the Navy and the Internal Revenue Service. He also engraved the state seals for Massachusetts, New York, New Hampshire, Vermont, Rhode Island, and Wisconsin. Outside of state and federal government engraving, Mitchell engraved the seals and coats of arms for many well-known institutions which include Harvard University, Society of the Cincinnati, and Boston Public Library. He engraved the Philadelphia Centennial Exhibition award medal (1876) which was struck in the Philadelphia Mint. In 1891, Mitchell was invited by the Secretary of the Treasury to join a committee to evaluate the artistic design proposals for a new issue of U.S. coins. The two other members were Charles E. Barber, Chief Engraver of the United States Mint, and Augustus Saint-Gaudens.

In addition to being considered an expert on heraldry, Mitchell was regarded as one of the best engravers and medal designers in the United States.

State Arms depicted on United States banknotes
The National Bank Act authorized the issue of a national currency. Historical vignettes on the front and back were the same by denomination (e.g., Landing of Columbus was on the reverse of all $5 notes) and the state coat of arms (located on the reverse left side) was coordinated with the geographic location of the issuing bank. Records do not clearly state who bore the responsibility for the design of the state arms (i.e., the U.S. Treasury Department, or the three bank note companies contracted for engraving and printing). It appears that the first dies (for New Jersey, Missouri, Minnesota, and Vermont) were completed by the American Bank Note Company by 9 October 1863 based on their own drawings. State arms appeared on the reverse of the Original and 1875 Series notes (first and second issue of the first design), and the 1882 Brown Back Series (the second design) of National Bank Notes.

Historical coats of arms
The main table contains four columns. Location refers to either the territory or state and is linked to the most relevant article (e.g., Seal of... or Coat of arms of...). All but one of the illustrations are included in a relevant article. Coat of arms contains the State Arms of the Union illustrations. National Bank Note contains the state arms found on U.S. National Currency between 1863 and the 1890s. Information lists the date of statehood and/or territorial organic act date and the date the state or territorial arms were accepted by constitutional convention or legislative assembly.

Missing territorial or state coats of arms 
When State Arms of the Union was published in 1876, some existing arms were not included (e.g., Arizona and Washington Territory). At the time, Alaska was classified as the Department of Alaska (1867–84) and became the District of Alaska (1884–1912) before becoming the Territory of Alaska (1912–59). The Alaska territorial seal was designed in 1910 and adopted in 1913. On 3 January 1959 Alaska became the 49th U.S. State. The Oklahoma Territory (1890–1907) Organic Act was approved on 2 May 1890, and a territorial seal was adopted on 10 January 1893. Hawaii, formerly the Kingdom of Hawaii (1795–1893), Republic of Hawaii (1894–98), and then Territory of Hawaii (1898–1959) became the 50th U.S. State on 21 August 1959. None of the territories or states mentioned above had a coat of arms represented on national currency.

See also 

 Coats of arms of the U.S. states

Notes

References

Citations

Sources

Further reading

External links
Heraldry of the World (U.S. States) at ngw.nl (archived)

Armorials of the United States